1985 is a novel by English writer Anthony Burgess. Originally this book was published in 1978, it was inspired by, and was intended as a tribute to, George Orwell's novel Nineteen Eighty-Four. It was adapted by Guy Meredith as a radio play and broadcast on BBC Radio 3 on 23 January 1985.

Plot introduction
1985 is in two parts. The first part, called "1984", is a series of essays and interviews (Burgess is the voice of the interviewer and the interviewee) discussing aspects of Orwell's book. The basic idea of dystopia is explicated, and term "kakotopia" is also brought up and explored etymologically. The etymology of the word "utopia" is also deconstructed. Burgess treats Orwell as being somewhat bound by his times. Orwell is seen somewhat as a war-exhausted Brit fearing the Soviet threat along with the spectre of atomic war. Orwell is treated as handling these ideas to the exclusion of other phenomena will come to alter British society. Burgess fairly well explicates the distinction between Orwell's "Ingsoc" and the more mundane "English socialism", as Burgess sees this actuality, in the Britain of his time.

The second part is a novella set in 1985, seven years in the future at the time of the novel's being written.

Rather than a sequel to Orwell's novel, Burgess uses the same concept. Based on his observation of British society and the world around him in 1978, he suggests how a possible 1985 might be if certain trends continue.

The main trend to which he is referring is the expanding power of trade unions. In the hypothetical 1985 envisioned in the book, the trade unions have become so powerful that they exert full control over society; unions exist for every imaginable occupation. Unions start strikes with little reason, and a strike by one union usually turns into a general strike.

Another major theme of the novella is the rise of Islam as a major cultural and political force in Britain, due to large-scale immigration from the Middle East; London abounds with mosques and rich Arabs. Arab property ownership plays a major role in the story's economic backdrop.

The protagonist is a school teacher, and somewhat of a proponent of Classicism. He is struggling within an education system which puts more stock in more directly practical approaches to study. He is also threatened by street toughs, from day to day. He gains status with them when he loses his professional status. They are outsiders, relative to the above-mentioned system. It is fashionable among them to embrace Classical studies, with a focus on, among other things, Greek and Latin linguistics.

Plot summary
At the novella's beginning, the protagonist, Bev Jones, confronts the death of his wife. She was in a hospital when it caught fire. As the firemen's union was striking, the hospital burned to the ground. Bev is left alone with his daughter  Bessie, who is thirteen years old but sexually precocious and unable to comprehend the difference between reality and fantasy, due to a thalidomide-like drug taken by her pregnant mother.

The death of his wife engenders in Bev a deep-seated hostility towards the union system – her last words were, "Don't let them get away with it". This is, however, not the first time Bev has been opposed to it, for he had previously been a history lecturer who stepped down as his work was considered expendable by the union-based system which favoured education of practical value.

Employed as a confectioner, he goes to work one day despite his union being on strike. For working during a strike, his union membership is revoked, making him effectively unemployable. Knowing that he will soon lose his home, he takes Bessie to a state-run facility where she will be cared for with other girls like herself.

Bev then becomes something of a vagrant, travelling around London and falling in with a group of similarly unemployable dissenters. With these, he engages in petty theft from shops to survive. Apprehended during one such sortie, he is sentenced to re-education at a state institution, which is neither a prison nor a psychiatric hospital, but contains elements of both. 

At the re-education centre, Bev is subjected to propaganda films and lectures, which have the aim of converting him into a useful member of society (a theme which Burgess also examines in A Clockwork Orange). He meets the powerful union official Pettigrew, who warns Bev that his day is over and that Syndicalism is the future of Britain. Despite this, Bev is unconverted and – having served his sentence – leaves as a free man.

Having been informed that Bessie will be ejected from the care facility because he refuses to recant his beliefs, he returns to London. In need of an income and a place to live, he joins a network called The Free Britons, which aims to provide infrastructure and order during the increasing strike-related chaos sweeping Britain. Bev effectively sells his daughter as a wife to a wealthy sheik, who takes a fancy to her during a visit to the Al-Dorchester, reasoning that at least this way she will be safe and satisfied. Meanwhile, he discovers that The Free Britons is a front for an Islamic group aiming at the re-establishment of Britain as a Muslim state.

Bev, because of his education, is employed as the mouthpiece of the Free Britons and called upon to report on the events of the general strike. He is frustrated when his work is censored by the leader, a man known as Colonel Lawrence. The spreading strike action reaches fever pitch and becomes a general strike, reported to the reader mostly in diary form. Charles III takes command of the country as it grinds to a halt. A few months after the strike, Bev is arrested again and sentenced to life in a secure institution, which again is neither prison nor hospital. The only way out of this facility is to be retrieved by a family member.

There, he revives his teaching career by giving informal history lessons to other prisoners. As the years stretch on, his syllabus (which had started with Anglo Saxon England) passes through the Renaissance, the Enlightenment, the Industrial Revolution, and approaches the late 20th century.

Snippets of news often circulate among the inmates, some of which suggest that the Muslim conversion of Britain is well-advanced (for example, it is claimed that inhabitants of the Isle of Man have recently discovered that a stimulant-depressant drug has been replacing alcohol in their beer for several years, in line with Muslim prohibitions). There is however no way in which the inmates can verify whether these news items are correct.

Bev finds it increasingly difficult to explain the continuity of history in terms of the present. Unable to do so, Bev suggests that they can start over again and work their way back to the present, after which his class spontaneously dismisses itself. Alone at night, Bev slips out of the dormitory in which he sleeps, creeps out into the grounds of the institution, and kills himself by deliberately touching the electric fence.

Release details
 1978, US, Little Brown, hardback (First edition). Published concurrently in Penthouse Magazine.
 1978, UK, Hutchinson, hardback
 1980, UK, Arrow, paperback
 2007, CZ, Maťa, hardback, Czech translation by Milan Mikulášek
 2013. UK, Serpent's Tail, paperback

References

External links
 Clive James review

1978 British novels
1978 science fiction novels
Dystopian novels
British satirical novels
Novels by Anthony Burgess
British trade unions history
Nineteen Eighty-Four
Islam in fiction
Novels about revolutionaries
Fiction set in 1985
British post-apocalyptic novels
Hutchinson (publisher) books
Novels about propaganda